Brian Martin Ortega (born February 21, 1991) is an American professional mixed martial artist. He currently competes in the Featherweight division in the Ultimate Fighting Championship (UFC). A professional since 2010, Ortega has also competed in the RFA, where he was the Featherweight Champion. As of July 18, 2022, he is #3 in the UFC featherweight rankings.

Background 
Ortega was born in Los Angeles, California; he is of Mexican descent and possesses dual nationality, as both his parents are from Hermosillo, Sonora, Mexico. He grew up in a Section 8 housing project of San Pedro, California. Brian started learning martial arts when he was 5 years old at Al Martinez Muay Thai Kickboxing in Wilmington, CA. When he turned 13, he began training Brazilian jiu-jitsu at the Gracie Jiu-Jitsu Academy under Rorion Gracie, and his sons Ryron, Rener, and Ralek Gracie in Torrance, California.

Mixed martial arts career

Early career
When Ortega was 17, he met boxing coach James Luhrsen, who took him in and trained him in striking skills. Ortega began his career competing for regional promotions exclusively in Southern California. He won his first pro-MMA championship against Carlos Garces in a five-round bout via unanimous decision, becoming the Respect In The Cage featherweight champion.

Ortega went on to compile an undefeated record of 8–0 before signing with the UFC in April 2014. He credited his success to support and love from James Luhrsen and Rener Gracie.

Ultimate Fighting Championship
Ortega was expected to make his promotional debut against Diego Brandão on May 31, 2014, at The Ultimate Fighter Brazil 3 Finale. However, Brandao pulled out of the bout in the days leading up to the event citing an injury. Due to the late nature of the change, officials did not try to find a replacement and Ortega was pulled from the card as well.

Ortega eventually made his debut on July 26, 2014, at UFC on Fox 12 against Mike De La Torre. Originally, a first round submission (rear-naked choke) win for Ortega, the result was changed to "No Contest" after Ortega tested positive for drostanolone during a post fight screening. Subsequently, Ortega was fined $2,500 and suspended for nine months.

Ortega faced Thiago Tavares on June 6, 2015, at UFC Fight Night 68. He won the back-and-forth fight via TKO in the third round. Both participants were awarded Fight of the Night honors.

Ortega faced Diego Brandão, who is a second-degree black belt in Brazilian jiu-jitsu, on January 2, 2016, at UFC 195. After being down against Diego's striking for the first two rounds, Ortega rallied and won via triangle choke in the third round.

At UFC 199 on June 4, 2016, Ortega defeated Clay Guida by KO in the third round. After winning the first round, Guida won the second round and looked to have the third won until Ortega rallied and won via a flying knee near the end of the round.

Ortega was expected to face Hacran Dias on October 1, 2016, at UFC Fight Night 96. However, Ortega pulled out of the fight in early September and was replaced by Andre Fili.

Ortega next faced Renato Moicano on July 29, 2017, at UFC 214. He won the back and forth fight via submission in the third round with a guillotine choke, while both fighters were awarded Fight of the Night bonus.

Ortega faced Cub Swanson on December 9, 2017, at UFC Fight Night 123. He was victorious in the fight, winning in the second round by guillotine choke submission. The finish put Ortega's streak at five straight fights won with a finish, which at the time was the second longest current win streak in the UFC featherweight division behind the champion, Max Holloway. The win also earned him the Fight of the Night and Performance of the Night honors.

Ortega faced Frankie Edgar on March 3, 2018, at UFC 222. He won the fight via knockout in the first round. In doing so, he became the first man to ever finish Edgar in MMA. This win earned him the Performance of the Night bonus.

Ortega was scheduled to face Max Holloway for the UFC Featherweight Championship on July 7, 2018, at UFC 226. However, on July 4, Holloway was pulled from the fight due to "concussion like symptoms". Hence, Ortega scratched from the fight after Holloway's withdrawal.

The fight against Max Holloway eventually took place on December 8, 2018, in the main event at UFC 231. Ortega lost the fight by doctor stoppage at the end of the fourth round. This fight earned him the Fight of the Night award.

Ortega was scheduled to face Chan Sung Jung on December 21, 2019, at UFC on ESPN+ 23.  However, Ortega pulled out of the fight in early December citing a knee injury. The bout against Jung eventually took place on October 18, 2020 at UFC Fight Night: Ortega vs. The Korean Zombie. Dropping Jung multiple times, Ortega won the one sided match by unanimous decision.

Ortega was scheduled for a UFC Featherweight Championship bout against current UFC Featherweight Champion Alexander Volkanovski on March 27, 2021, at UFC 260. However, the fight was cancelled due to COVID-19 protocols.

On April 2, 2021, it was announced that Alexander Volkanovski and Ortega will be the coaches for The Ultimate Fighter 29 at ESPN+ and the show will feature contestants at bantamweight and middleweight.

Ortega faced Alexander Volkanovski on September 25, 2021, at UFC 266 for the UFC Featherweight Championship.  He lost the fight via unanimous decision. This fight earned him the Fight of the Night award.

Ortega faced Yair Rodríguez on July 16, 2022, at UFC on ABC 3. He lost the fight via TKO at the end of the first round after suffering a dislocated shoulder which rendered him unable to continue.

Championships and accomplishments
Ultimate Fighting Championship
Fight of the Night (Five times) 
Performance of the Night (Two times) 
Resurrection Fighting Alliance
RFA Featherweight Champion (one time)
World MMA Awards
2017 Breakthrough Fighter of the Year
MMAJunkie.com
2015 June Fight of the Month vs. Thiago Tavares
2021 September Fight of the Month vs. Alexander Volkanovski
ESPN
2021 Fight of the Year vs. Alexander Volkanovski
MMA Mania
2021 Fight of the Year vs. Alexander Volkanovski
MMA Sucka
2021 Fight of the Year vs. Alexander Volkanovski

Controversies

UFC 248 incident 
On March 8, 2020, a police report was filed against Ortega for allegedly slapping rapper Jay Park, translator for Chan Sung Jung (Korean Zombie), at UFC 248.

Personal life 
Brian Ortega has two sons. He is currently engaged to fellow UFC fighter Tracy Cortez.

Mixed martial arts record

|-
|Loss
|align=center|15–3 (1)
|Yair Rodríguez
|TKO (shoulder injury)
|UFC on ABC: Ortega vs. Rodríguez
|
|align=center|1
|align=center|4:11
|Elmont, New York, United States
|
|-
|Loss
|align=center|15–2 (1)
|Alexander Volkanovski
|Decision (unanimous)
|UFC 266
|
|align=center|5
|align=center|5:00
|Las Vegas, Nevada, United States
|
|-
|Win
|align=center|15–1 (1)
|Chan Sung Jung
|Decision (unanimous)
|UFC Fight Night: Ortega vs. The Korean Zombie
|
|align=center|5
|align=center|5:00
|Abu Dhabi, United Arab Emirates
|
|-
|Loss
|align=center|14–1 (1)
|Max Holloway
|TKO (doctor stoppage)
|UFC 231
|
|align=center|4
|align=center|5:00
|Toronto, Ontario, Canada
|
|-
|Win
|align=center|14–0 (1)
|Frankie Edgar
|KO (punch)
|UFC 222
|
|align=center|1
|align=center|4:44
|Las Vegas, Nevada, United States
|
|-
|Win
|align=center|13–0 (1)
|Cub Swanson
|Submission (guillotine choke)
|UFC Fight Night: Swanson vs. Ortega
|
|align=center|2
|align=center|3:22
|Fresno, California, United States
|
|-
|Win
|align=center|12–0 (1)
|Renato Moicano
|Submission (guillotine choke)
|UFC 214
|
|align=center|3
|align=center|2:59
|Anaheim, California, United States
|
|-
|Win
|align=center|11–0 (1)
|Clay Guida
|KO (knee)
|UFC 199
|
|align=center|3
|align=center|4:40
|Inglewood, California, United States
|
|-
|Win
|align=center|10–0 (1)
|Diego Brandão
|Submission (triangle choke)
|UFC 195
|
|align=center|3
|align=center|1:37
|Las Vegas, Nevada, United States
|
|-
|Win
|align=center|9–0 (1)
|Thiago Tavares
|TKO (punches)
|UFC Fight Night: Boetsch vs. Henderson
|
|align=center|3
|align=center|4:10
|New Orleans, Louisiana, United States
|
|-
|NC
|align=center|8–0 (1)
|Mike De La Torre
|NC (overturned)
|UFC on Fox: Lawler vs. Brown
|
|align=center|1
|align=center|1:39
|San Jose, California, United States
|
|-
|Win
|align=center|8–0
|Keoni Koch
|Decision (split)
|RFA 12
|
|align=center|5
|align=center|5:00
|Los Angeles, California, United States
|
|-
|Win
|align=center|7–0
|Jordan Rinaldi
|Submission (triangle choke)
|RFA 9
|
|align=center|3
|align=center|2:29
|Pomona, California, United States
|
|-
|Win
|align=center|6–0
|Thomas Guimond
|Submission (triangle choke)
|Respect In The Cage 20
|
|align=center|1
|align=center|4:02
|Pomona, California, United States
|
|-
|Win
|align=center|5–0
|Carlos Garces
|Decision (unanimous)
|Respect In The Cage 10
|
|align=center|5
|align=center|5:00
|Pomona, California, United States
|
|-
|Win
|align=center|4–0
|Chris Mercado
|Decision (unanimous)
|Respect In The Cage 9
|
|align=center|3
|align=center|5:00
|Pomona, California, United States
|
|-
|Win
|align=center|3–0
|Vincent Martinez
|Submission (rear-naked choke)
|Respect In The Cage 5
|
|align=center|1
|align=center|1:54
|Los Angeles, California, United States
|
|-
|Win
|align=center|2–0
|Brady Harrison
|Decision (unanimous)
|Gladiator Challenge: Bad Behaviour
|
|align=center|3
|align=center|5:00
|San Jacinto, California, United States
|
|-
|Win
|align=center|1–0
|John Sassone
|Submission (triangle choke)
|Gladiator Challenge: Maximum Force
|
|align=center|1
|align=center|1:48
|San Jacinto, California, United States
|

See also
 List of current UFC fighters
 List of male mixed martial artists

References

External links
 
 

1991 births
American mixed martial artists of Mexican descent
American male mixed martial artists
American practitioners of Brazilian jiu-jitsu
American sportspeople in doping cases
Doping cases in mixed martial arts
Featherweight mixed martial artists
People awarded a black belt in Brazilian jiu-jitsu
Living people
People from Torrance, California
Ultimate Fighting Championship male fighters
People from San Pedro, Los Angeles
Mixed martial artists utilizing Brazilian jiu-jitsu